Iringa Airport  is an airport in Tanzania serving Iringa and the surrounding Iringa Region. The airport's single runway lies parallel to the A104 trunk road.

Airlines and destinations

See also

 List of airports in Tanzania
 Transport in Tanzania

References

External links

Tanzania Airports Authority

Airports in Tanzania
Buildings and structures in the Iringa Region